This is a list of notable members of Alpha Kappa Psi fraternity.

Government

U.S. Presidents and Vice Presidents

U.S. President Ronald Reagan (1981–1989) (Alpha Zeta '63 Honorary)
U.S. President Richard Nixon (1969–1974) (Beta Omicron '60 Honorary)
U.S. Vice President Richard Nixon (1953–1961) (Beta Omicron '60 Honorary)

U.S. Senators and Representatives

U.S. Senator from Tennessee Lamar Alexander (2002–2021) (Delta Kappa '80 Honorary)
U.S. Senator from Wyoming Michael B. Enzi (1997–present) (Beta Mu '64)
U.S. Senator from Indiana Richard Lugar (1977–2013) (Hoosier "Indianapolis" Alumni '68 Honorary)
U.S. Senator from Oregon Mark O. Hatfield (1967–1997) (Kappa '66 Honorary)
U.S. Senator from Mississippi John C. Stennis (1947–1989); President Pro Tempore (1987–1989) (Delta Lambda '66 Honorary)
U.S. Senator from Missouri Thomas F. Eagleton (1969–1987) (Upsilon '67 Honorary)
U.S. Senator from Arizona Barry M. Goldwater (1953–1965, 1969–1987) (Beta Mu '63 Honorary)
U.S. Senator from Texas John G. Tower (1961–1985) (Epsilon Eta '61 Honorary)
U.S. Senator from Washington Henry M. Jackson (1953–1983) (Rho '70 Honorary)
U.S. Senator from Georgia Herman E. Talmadge (1957–1981) (Pi '54 Honorary)
U.S. Senator from Michigan Robert P. Griffin (1966–1979); Senate Minority Whip (1969–1977) (Epsilon Zeta '67 Honorary)
U.S. Senator from New Mexico Joseph M. Montoya (1964–1977) (Beta Tau '64 Honorary)
U.S. Senator from Arkansas John L. McClellan (1943–1977) (Epsilon Omicron '64 Honorary)
U.S. Senator from Missouri W. Stuart Symington (1953–1976) (Delta Sigma '64 Honorary)
U.S. Senator from Florida Edward J. Gurney (1969–1974) (Alpha Phi '68 Honorary)
U.S. Senator from Texas Ralph W. Yarborough (1957–1971) (Beta Tau '68 Honorary)
U.S. Senator from Illinois Paul H. Douglas (1949–1967) (Epsilon '17 Faculty)
U.S. Senator from Massachusetts Leverett A. Saltonstall (1945–1967) Senate Majority/Minority Whip (Gamma Nu)
U.S. Senator from Wisconsin Alexander Wiley (1939–1963) (Delta Phi '62 Honorary)
U.S. Senator from Wyoming Frank A. Barrett (1953–1959) (Beta Nu '52 Honorary)
U.S. Senator from California Richard Nixon (1950–1953) (Beta Omicron '60 Honorary)
U.S. Senator from Nebraska Kenneth Wherry (1943–1951) Senate Majority/Minority Whip, Senate Minority Leader (Xi '16)
U.S. Senator from Kansas Harry Darby (1949–1950) (Psi '50 Honorary)
U.S. Senator from North Carolina William B. Umstead (1946–1948) (Alpha Tau '53 Honorary)
U.S. Senator from New Jersey Arthur Walsh (1943–1944) (Alpha '35)
U.S. Representative from North Carolina, William B. Umstead (1933–1939) (Alpha Tau '53 Honorary)
U.S. Representative from Texas, 19th District Randy Neugebauer (2003–present) (Eta Theta)
U.S. Representative from Texas, 3rd District Sam Johnson (1991–present) (Alpha Pi)
U.S. Representative from Nebraska, 2nd District Harold Daub (1981–1989) (Alpha Lambda '62)
U.S. Representative from Texas, 19th District Kent Hance (1979–1985) (Eta Theta '69 Faculty)
U.S. Representative from Virginia, 6th District J. Lindsay Almond (1946–1948) (Beta Xi '60 Honorary)
U.S. Representative from Florida, 3rd District Millard F. Caldwell (1933–1941) (Alpha Phi '53 Honorary)
U.S. Representative from California, 12th District Richard Nixon (1947–1950) (Beta Omicron '60 Honorary)
U.S. Representative from Wyoming, At-Large Frank A. Barrett (1943–1951) (Beta Nu '52 Honorary)
U.S. Representative from Washington, 2nd District Henry M. Jackson (1941–1953) (Rho '70 Honorary)
U.S. Representative from Michigan, 9th District Robert P. Griffin (1957–1966)(Epsilon Zeta '67 Honorary)
U.S. Representative from New Mexico, At-Large Joseph M. Montoya (1957–1964) (Beta Tau '64 Honorary)
U.S. Representative from Arkansas, 6th District John L. McClellan (1935–1939) (Epsilon Omicron '64 Honorary)
U.S. Representative from Florida, 11th & 5th District Edward J. Gurney (1962–1968) (Alpha Phi '68 Honorary)
U.S. Representative from Kansas, 1st District William H. Avery (1955–1965) (Alpha Omega '65 Honorary)
U.S. Representative from Illinois, At-Large William Stratton (1940–42, 1944–46) (Delta Psi '60 Honorary)
U.S. Representative from Wisconsin, 3rd District Vernon W. Thomson (1961–1974) (Alpha Mu '58 Honorary)

U.S. Secretaries, chairs, and advisors
U.S. Secretary of Commerce Luther H. Hodges (1961–1965) (Alpha Tau '56 Honorary)
U.S. Secretary of Commerce Daniel C. Roper (1933–1938) (Beta Eta '34 Honorary)
U.S. Secretary of Commerce C. R. Smith (1968–1969) (Iota '24)
U.S. Secretary of Defense Robert S. McNamara (Phi '60 Honorary)
U.S. Secretary of Education Lamar Alexander (1991–93) (Delta Kappa '80 Honorary)
U.S. Secretary of Health and Human Services Donna Shalala (1993–2001) (Beta Pi)
U.S. Secretary of Housing and Urban Development George W. Romney (1969–1973) (Phi '63 Honorary)
Director of the National Security Agency Samuel C. Phillips (1972–1973) (Upsilon '66 Honorary)
Assistant Secretary of State for African Affairs G. Mennen Williams (1961–1966) (Epsilon Zeta '66 Honorary)
U.S. Secretary of the Air Force W. Stuart Symington (Served as the First Secretary) (1947–1950) (Delta Sigma '64 Honorary)
Federal Reserve Board Chairman William McChesney Martin, Jr. (1951–1970) (Beta Mu '57 Honorary)
Presidential Economic Advisor Walter Heller, Advisor to the John F. Kennedy and Lyndon B. Johnson  (Alpha Eta '47 Faculty) Administrations
Commissioner of Internal Revenue Daniel C. Roper (1917–1920) (Beta Eta '34 Honorary)
Chief Accountant United States Securities and Exchange Commission L. Glenn Perry (1982–1984) (Epsilon Lambda '65 or '66)
Chairman of the Democratic National Committee Henry M. Jackson (1960–1961) (Rho '70 Honorary)
Director of the Federal Civil Defense Administration Val Peterson (1953–1957) (Zeta '49 Honorary)

Federal judges
J. Lindsay Almond – Judge of U.S. Court of Customs and Patent Appeals (1962–1982); Judge of U.S. Court of Appeals (1982–1986) (Beta Xi '60 Honorary)
Otto Kerner, Jr. – Judge of United States Court of Appeals for the Seventh Circuit (1968–1974) (Epsilon '62 Honorary)
James Kenneth Logan – Judge of U.S. Court of Appeals for the 10th Circuit (1977–1994) (Psi '50)

State governors
Governor of Arkansas Carl E. Bailey (1937–1941) (Beta Zeta '40 Honorary)
Governor of Minnesota Harold E. Stassen (1939–1943) (Alpha Eta '58 Honorary)
Governor of Massachusetts Leverett A. Saltonstall (1939–1945)(Gamma Nu)
Governor of West Virginia Clarence W. Meadows (1945–1949) (Alpha Delta '23)
Governor of Florida Millard F. Caldwell (1945–1949) (Alpha Phi '53 Honorary)
Governor of Nebraska Val Peterson (1947–1953) (Zeta '49 Honorary)
Governor of Wyoming Frank A. Barrett (1951–1953) (Beta Nu '52 Honorary)
Governor of North Carolina William B. Umstead (1953–1954) (Alpha Tau '53 Honorary)
Governor of Georgia Herman E. Talmadge (1947–1955) (Pi '54 Honorary)
Governor of California Goodwin J. Knight (1953–1959) (Alpha Zeta '57 Honorary)
Governor of Wisconsin Vernon W. Thomson (1957–1959) (Alpha Mu '58 Honorary)
Governor of Michigan G. Mennen Williams (1949–1961) (Epsilon Zeta '66 Honorary)
Governor of Illinois William G. Stratton (1953–1961) (Delta Psi '60 Honorary)
Governor of North Carolina Luther H. Hodges (1954–1961) (Alpha Tau '56 Honorary)
Governor of Florida LeRoy Collins (1955–1961) (Beta Psi '57 Honorary)
Governor of Michigan George W. Romney (1963–1969) (Phi '63 Honorary)
Governor of Virginia J. Lindsay Almond (1958–1962) (Beta Xi '60 Honorary)
Governor of Georgia S. Ernest Vandiver (1959–1963) (Pi)
Governor of Michigan John B. Swainson (1961–1963) (Eta Zeta)
Governor of Minnesota Elmer L. Andersen (1961–1963) (Alpha Eta)
Governor of Vermont F. Ray Keyser, Jr. (1961–1963) (Gamma Omicron)
Governor of Kansas John Anderson, Jr. (1961–1965) (Psi)
Governor of Florida C. Farris Bryant (1961–1965) (Alpha Phi '33)
Governor of Oregon Mark O. Hatfield (1959–1967) (Kappa '65 Honorary)
Governor of Georgia Carl E. Sanders (1963–1967) (Atlanta Alumni)
Governor of Florida W. Haydon Burns (1965–1967) (Jacksonville Alumni Chapter, Honorary '62)
Governor of Kansas William H. Avery (1965–1967) (Alpha Omega '65 Honorary)
Governor of Illinois Otto Kerner, Jr. (1961–1968) (Epsilon '62 Honorary)
Governor of Tennessee Buford Ellington (1959–1963, 1967–1971) (Delta Kappa)
Governor of Wisconsin Warren P. Knowles (1965–1971) (Alpha Mu)
Governor of Colorado John Arthur Love (1963–1973) (Gamma Zeta)
Governor of Missouri Warren E. Hearnes (1965–1973) (Delta Sigma)
Governor of Texas Preston E. Smith (1969–1973) (Eta Theta)
Governor of California Ronald Reagan (1966–1975) (Alpha Zeta '63 Honorary)
Governor of Utah Cal Rampton (1965–1977) (Alpha Theta)
Governor of Iowa Robert D. Ray (1969–1983) (Beta Phi)
Governor of Michigan William G. Milliken (1969–1983) (Motor City Alumni)
Governor of Tennessee Lamar Alexander (1979–1987) (Delta Kappa '80 Honorary)
Governor of Florida Wayne Mixson (Jan 3–6, 1987) (Alpha Phi '47)
Lt. Governor of Missouri Thomas F. Eagleton (1965–1968) (Upsilon '67 Honorary)
Lt. Governor of New Mexico Joseph M. Montoya (1947–1951; 1955–1957) (Beta Tau '64 Honorary)
Lt. Governor of Michigan William G. Milliken (1965–1969) (Motor City Alumni)
Lt. Governor of Texas Preston Smith (1963–1968)
Lt. Governor of Wisconsin Warren P. Knowles (1965-1961)
Lt. Governor of Michigan John Swainson (1958–1960) (Motor City Alumni)
Lt. Governor of Georgia Ernest Vandiver (1954–1958)
Lt. Governor of North Carolina Luther H. Hodges (1952–1954) (Alpha Tau '56 Honorary)
Lt. Governor of Florida Thomas Burton Adams, Jr. (1971–1975)
Lt. Governor of Florida Wayne Mixson (1979–1987) (Alpha Phi '47)
Lt. Governor of California Goodwin J. Knight (1947–1953) (Alpha Zeta '57 Honorary)

State legislators and civic leaders
James Antonio – State Auditor of Missouri, 1978–1984 (Upsilon)
W. Haydon Burns – Mayor of Jacksonville, Florida (1949–1965) (Jacksonville Alumni Chapter, Honorary '62)
Hal Daub – Mayor of Omaha, Nebraska (1995–2001) (Alpha Lambda '62)
Michael B. Enzi – Wyoming State Senator, 24th District (1991–1997) (Beta Mu '64)
Mark O. Hatfield Secretary of State of Oregon (1957–1959) (Kappa '65 Honorary)
Richard Lugar Mayor of Indianapolis, Indiana (Hoosier "Indianapolis" Alumni '68 Honorary)
C. Farris Bryant – Representative, Florida House of Representatives, (1942, 1946–1956); Speaker of the Florida House of Representatives (1953–1954)(Alpha Phi '33)
Robert D. Ray, Mayor of Des Moines, Iowa
Thomas Burton Adams, Jr. – Florida State Senator (1956–1960); Secretary of State of Florida (1961–1971)
Millard F. Caldwell – Florida House of Representatives (1929–1932) (Alpha Phi '53 Honorary)
Robert D. Fleming – Pennsylvania House of Representatives (1938–1950); Pennsylvania State Senator (1950–Present)
Clarence W. Meadows – West Virginia House of Delegates, Raleigh County (1931–1932) (Alpha Delta '23)
Richard Arthur Young – Michigan House of Representatives, 32nd & 33rd Districts (1965–1994)
Frank J. Kelley — Michigan Attorney General (1961–1998)
Kent Hance – Texas State Senate, 28th District (1975–1979) (Eta Theta '69 Faculty)
Frank A. Barrett – Wyoming State Senator (1933–1935) (Beta Nu '52 Honorary)
Thomas F. Eagleton – Attorney General of Missouri (1961–1965) (Upsilon '67 Honorary)
Joseph M. Montoya – New Mexico House of Representatives (1936–1940); New Mexico State Senate (1940–1946) (Beta Tau '64 Honorary)
Emanuel Pleitez – Current candidate for mayor of Los Angeles in the 2013 election (Pi Tau)
Ralph Turlington – Florida House of Representatives, Alachua County (1950–1975 (Alpha Phi '47Faculty)
C. Fred Jones – Florida House of Representatives, 52nd District (1972–1992) (Alpha Phi '50)
William A. Shands – Florida Senate, 32nd District (1940–1958) (Alpha Phi '55Honorary)
Robert King High – Mayor of Miami, Florida (1957–1967) (Alpha Phi '64Honorary)
Vernon W. Thomson Attorney General of Wisconsin (1951–1957) (Alpha Mu '58 Honorary)
Vernon W. Thomson Member of the Wisconsin State Assembly (1935–1951) (Alpha Mu '58 Honorary)
LeRoy Collins Florida House of Representatives (1934–1940) (Beta Psi '57 Honorary)
LeRoy Collins Florida State Senate (1940–1954 with a break during the war) (Beta Psi '57 Honorary)
Elmer L. Andersen Minnesota State Senate, 42nd District (1949–1959) (Alpha Eta)
Tonya Schuitmaker Michigan State Senate, 20th District (2011–present); Michigan House of Representatives, 80th District (2005–2011) (Gamma Mu)

State judges
Millard F. Caldwell – Justice of Florida State Supreme Court (1962–1969) (Alpha Phi '53 Honorary)
Ben Overton – Justice of the Florida State Supreme Court (1974–1999) (Alpha Phi '48)
Robert P. Griffin – Justice of the Michigan State Supreme Court (1987–1994) (Epsilon Zeta '67 Honorary)
William G. Milliken – Justice of the Michigan State Supreme Court (Motor City Alumni)
G. Mennen Williams – Justice of the Michigan State Supreme Court (1970–1987); Chief Justice (1983–1987) (Epsilon Zeta '66 Honorary)

International
Benazir Bhutto, Prime Minister of Pakistan (1988–1990; 1993–1996) (Xi Chi)
Leonard Firestone, U.S. Ambassador to Belgium (1974–1976) (Alpha Zeta)
Robert S. McNamara, president of the World Bank Group (1968–1981) (Phi '60 Honorary)
Val Peterson, U.S. Ambassador to Denmark (1957–1961) (Zeta '49 Honorary)
Val Peterson, U.S. Ambassador to Finland (1969–1973) (Zeta '49 Honorary)
Daniel C. Roper, U.S. Ambassador to Canada (1939) (Beta Eta '34 Honorary)
G. Mennen Williams, U.S. Ambassador to the Philippines (1968) (Epsilon Zeta '66 Honorary)
Jan E. Frydman, Consul of the Principality of Monaco to Sweden (2020 -) (Kappa '79 Life)

Business and industry leaders
Retail
Joyce C. Hall, Founder, Hallmark Cards (Psi)
Bernie Marcus, Founder, The Home Depot
James Cash Penney, Founder, J. C. Penney (Upsilon)
Robert M. Beall II, Chairman and former CEO, Bealls (Florida) (Alpha Phi '65)

Media
Malcolm 'Steve' Forbes Jr., Editor-in-Chief, Forbes magazine

Technology
Alexis Ohanian, Co-Founder, reddit (Alpha Gamma)≈

Hotels
J. Willard Marriott, Founder, Marriott International (Beta Mu)

Aeronautics
William M. Allen, president of Boeing from 1945 to 1970; chairman from 1970 to 1972 (Rho)
David S. Lewis, Jr., president of McDonnell Aircraft from 1962 to 1967; chairman and CEO of General Dynamics from 1971 to 1985 (Alpha Lambda)
Edward V. Rickenbacker, World War I Medal of Honor recipient; chairman of Eastern Air Lines from 1954 to 1963 (Milwaukee Alumni)
Robert F. Six, founder and CEO of Continental Airlines from 1936 to 1981 (Beta)
C.R. Smith, CEO of American Airlines from 1934 to 1968 and from 1973 to 1974 (Iota '24)
Dwane L. Wallace, president of Cessna from 1936 to 1975 (Gamma Upsilon)

Finance and insurance
Arthur E. Andersen, Founder, Arthur Andersen (Gamma)
David Dodd, Co-Author, Security Analysis
T. Boone Pickens, Chairman of BP Capital Management, philanthropist, and alternative energy advocate  (Eta Theta)
William A. Scroggs, insurance agent and Founder, Kappa Kappa Psi National Honorary Band Fraternity (Tau)

Construction and raw materials
Elmer L. Andersen, President, HB Fuller Company
Murray M. Baker, President, Caterpillar Inc. (Gamma Theta)
Leonard Firestone, President, Firestone Tire and Rubber Company (Alpha Zeta)

Food and beverage
J. Paul Austin, president of Coca-Cola from 1962 to 1971; chairman from 1970 to 1981 (Atlanta Alumni)
Harry A. Bullis, Chairman of the Board, General Mills (Alpha Eta)
Leonard Firestone, Founder, Firestone Vinyards (Alpha Zeta)
Norman R. Klug, President, Miller Brewing (Alpha Psi)

Automotive
Harlow H. Curtice, president of General Motors from 1953 to 1958 (Phi)
Frederic G. Donner, chairman of the board of General Motors from 1958 to 1967 (Phi)
George W. Romney, Chairman of the Board & President, American Motors Corporation (1954–1962) (Phi '63 Honorary)
James A. Ryder, Founder, Ryder (Beta Pi)
Lee Iacocca, President of Chrysler Corporation
Robert S. McNamara, president of the Ford Motor Company (1960) (Phi '60 Honorary)

Transportation
Ronald Batory, President & CEO, Consolidated Rail Corporation (Conrail), (Eta Pi)

Telecommunications and utilities
Joe T. Ford, co-founder, former CEO, and current chairman, Alltel (Beta Zeta)

Science, education, and culture
Education
John S. Allen, President, University of Florida (1953–1955) Founding President, University of South Florida (1957–1970) (Alpha Phi '54 Honorary)
Harmon W. Caldwell, President, University of Georgia (1935–1938), Chancellor University System of Georgia (1938–1964)
Doak S. Campbell, President, Florida State University
Harwell Davis, President, Samford University
Arthur Edens, President Duke University (1949–1960)
Elmer Ellis, President, University of Missouri (1954–1963), and University of Missouri System (1963–1966)
David Friday, President, Michigan State University (1922–1923)
Kent Hance, Chancellor Texas Tech University (2006–Present) (Eta Theta '69 Faculty)
Franklin Harris, President Brigham Young University and Utah State University
John Hitt, President, University of Central Florida (1992–Present)
Stephen Horn, President, California State University Long Beach
David Kinley, President University of Illinois
Deane W. Malott, chancellor of the University of Kansas (1939–1951) and president of Cornell University (1951–1963)(Psi)
C. Peter Magrath, President, University of Minnesota (1974–1984), president of University of Missouri System (1985–1991), president West Virginia University (2008–2009)
Cloyd Marvin, President, George Washington University (1927–1959) and University of Arizona (1922–1927)
Alan G. Merten, President, George Mason University (1996–2012), Dean, Samuel Curtis Johnson Graduate School of Management, Cornell University (1989–1996), Dean, Warrington College of Business, University of Florida (1986–89) (Alpha Phi, '87 Faculty)
Tim Miller, President, Murray State University (2013–present) (Eta Iota)
Malcolm Moos, President, University of Minnesota (1967–1974)
David W. Mullins, President, University of Arkansas
Carroll Newsom, President New York University (1956–1962)
Robert A. Plane, President, Clarkson University (1974–1985), and Wells College (1991–1995)
Robert D. Ray, President, Drake University (1998–1999)
J. Wayne Reitz – President, University of Florida (1955–1967) (Alpha Phi '60Honorary)
Herman Schneider, President University of Cincinnati (1929–1932), founder of cooperative education
Donna Shalala, President University of Miami (2001–2015), Chancellor University of Wisconsin–Madison (1987–1993), President Hunter College (1980–1988) (Beta Pi)
Elvis Stahr, President, Indiana University Bloomington
Henry King Stanford, President, University of Georgia (1986–87), President, University of Miami (1962–1981), President, Birmingham-Southern College (1957–1962) (Beta '48)
Harold E. Stassen, President, University of Pennsylvania (1948–1953) (Alpha Eta '58 Honorary)
Charles Steger, President, Virginia Tech (2000–Present)
Beheruz Sethna, President, University of West Georgia (1994–present)
Norman Topping, President, University of Southern California (1958–1970)
Paul Torgersen, President, Virginia Tech (1994–2000)
Ralph Turlington – Florida Commissioner of Education (1974–1986) (Alpha Phi '47Faculty)
Herman B Wells, President, Indiana University
Charles E. Young, Chancellor, University of California Los Angeles

Foundations and religion

Thomas S. Monson, President of the Church, The Church of Jesus Christ of Latter-day Saints
Edwin Feulner, President, Heritage Foundation
Ronald Reagan, President, Screen Actors Guild, (1947–1952, 1959–1960) (Alpha Zeta '63 Honorary)
George Kozmetsky, Founder, IC² Institute
William Alexander Scroggs, Raymond D. Shannon, and Dick Hurst, Founders, Kappa Kappa Psi Honorary Band Fraternity
Donna Shalala, President, Clinton Foundation (2015–Present) (Beta Pi)

NASA

F. Story Musgrave, Most Experienced Astronaut in History (Alpha Omicron)
Samuel C. Phillips, Major General and Director, Project Apollo (1964–1969) (Upsilon '66 Honorary)
William C. Schneider, Missions Operations Director, Gemini Program (Upsilon)
Robert H. Charles, Assistant Secretary of the Air Force (1964–68) (Upsilon)

September 11 victims and heroes
Thomas E. Burnett Jr., Passenger on United Airlines Flight 93, (Alpha Eta '85)

Entertainment
David Hartman, original host of Good Morning America (Beta Eta)
Errol Barnett, Anchor and Correspondent for CNN International (Alpha Upsilon)
Theodore M. McCarty, CEO of Gibson Guitars from 1948 to 1966 (Eta)
Phaedra Parks, lawyer and reality TV star, The Real Housewives of Atlanta (Nu Omega)

Distinguished honors and awards
Presidential Medal of Freedom
Donna Shalala (Beta Pi), Presidential Medal of Freedom (2008) by George W. Bush

References

Alpha Kappa Psi
members